Tabcorp Park is an Australian horse racing venue situated in Melton, Victoria, Australia;  north-west of the Melbourne CBD. It is used for harness racing and is operated by Harness Racing Victoria.

Overview
Tabcorp Park incorporates a   track as well as a host of amenities such as restaurants, gaming machines, hotel accommodation and conference facilities. The new Melton track has replaced the existing metropolitan track at Moonee Valley.

The bistro and gaming lounge was opened on 5 March 2009 while the first race was held on 5 July 2009. It was a VicBred 2YO Fillies Semi Final won by Lady Belladonna.

See also
Glossary of Australian and New Zealand punting
Harness racing
Harness racing in Australia
Harness Racing Victoria

References

Tabcorp Park new home of harness (Shire Of Melton) - http://www.melton.vic.gov.au/page/page.asp?page_Id=1419

External links

Harness racing in Australia
Tabcorp Park

Harness racing in Australia
Horse racing venues in Australia
Sports venues completed in 2009
2009 establishments in Australia
City of Melton